David Murray may refer to:

Business 
 David Murray (Australian businessman) (born 1949), CEO of the Commonwealth Bank of Australia
 Sir David Murray (Scottish businessman) (born 1951), chairman of Rangers Football Club
 David Isaac Murray (born 1983), American entrepreneur and computer scientist

Entertainment
 Sir David Murray (painter) (1849–1933), Scottish landscape painter
 David Murray (saxophonist) (born 1955), American jazz saxophonist and clarinetist
 Dave Murray (musician) (born 1956), British guitarist for the heavy metal band Iron Maiden
 David Murray (actor) (born 1970), Irish actor

Politics 
 David Murray, 1st Viscount of Stormont (died 1631), Scottish courtier
 Sir David Murray (poet) (1567–1629), favourite of Henry, Prince of Wales
 David Murray, 5th Viscount of Stormont (1665–1731), Scottish peer
 David Murray, 6th Viscount of Stormont (c. 1690–1748), Scottish peer
 David Murray, 2nd Earl of Mansfield (1727–1796), 7th Viscount of Stormont
 David Murray (1748–1794), MP for Peeblesshire and New Radnor
 David William Murray, 3rd Earl of Mansfield (1777–1840), British army officer and peer
 David Murray (South Australian politician) (1829–1907), member of lower house in the 1870s, upper house 1882 to 1891
 Sir David King Murray, Lord Birnam (1884–1955), Scottish politician and judge
 David Murray (New South Wales politician) (1885–1928), member of the New South Wales Legislative Assembly
 David Murray (Scottish politician) (1900–?), Scottish nationalist and Liberal Party politician

Sports

Association football (soccer)
 David Murray (footballer, born 1882) (1882–1915), Scottish football player for Liverpool and Everton
 David Murray (soccer, born 1901), South African football player for Bristol Rovers
 David Murray (footballer, born 1967), English football player for Chester City

Other sports
 David Murray (racing driver) (1909–1973), Scottish Formula One driver
 David Murray (water polo) (1925–2020), British Olympic water polo player
 David Murray (cricketer) (1950–2022), West Indian cricketer
 Dave Murray (skier) (1953–1990), Canadian alpine skier
 David Murray (Australian footballer) (born 1955), Australian footballer for Melbourne
 David Murray (rugby union) (born 1995), South African rugby union player
 Dave Murray (American football), American football coach and player

Other

 David Murray (bishop), Anglican bishop
 David Murray (educator) (1830–1905), American educator and government adviser in Meiji period Japan
 David Murray (solicitor, born 1842) (1842–1928), Scottish lawyer, antiquarian, and bibliophile
 David Christie Murray (1847–1907), English journalist and writer
 David Stark Murray (1900–1977), British president of the Socialist Medical Association
 David Murray (RAF officer) (born 1963), British air marshal
 David Leslie Murray, British author and editor of the Times Literary Supplement
 Sir David Murray, 4th Baronet (died 1769), Scottish Jacobite soldier.
 David Murray, "The 8-Bit Guy", American retrocomputing enthusiast and YouTuber
David Murray, Liverpool, UK inventor of cheesy chips.